"The Raggle Taggle Gypsy", is a traditional folk song that originated as a Scottish border ballad, and has been popular throughout Britain, Ireland and North America. It concerns a rich lady who runs off to join the gypsies (or one gypsy). Common alternative names are "Gypsy Davy", "The Raggle Taggle Gypsies O", "The Gypsy Laddie(s)", "Black Jack David" (or "Davy") and "Seven Yellow Gypsies".

In the folk tradition the song was extremely popular, spread all over the English-speaking world by broadsheets and oral tradition. According to Roud and Bishop,"Definitely in the top five Child ballads in terms of widespread popularity, and possibly second only to 'Barbara Allen', the Gypsies stealing the lady, or, to put it the other way round, the lady running off with the sexy Gypsies, has caught singers' attention all over the anglophone world for more than 200 years. For obvious reasons, the song has long been a favourite with members of the travelling community."

Synopsis

The core of the song's story is that a lady forsakes a life of luxury to run off with a band of gypsies. In some versions there is one individual, named Johnny Faa or Black Jack Davy, whereas in others there is one leader and his six brothers. In some versions the lady is identified as Margaret Kennedy, the wife of the Scottish Earl of Cassilis. 

In a typical version, the lord comes home to find his lady "gone with the gypsy laddie". Sometimes this is because the gypsies have charmed her with their singing or even cast a spell over her.

He saddles his fastest horse to follow her. He finds her and bids her come home, asking "Would you forsake your husband and child?" She refuses to return, in many versions, preferring the cold ground, stating, "What care I for your fine feather sheets?", and the gypsy's company to her lord's wealth and fine bed. 

At the end of some versions, the husband kills the gypsies. In the local Cassilis tradition, they are hanged on the Cassilis Dule Tree.

Origins and early history

"The Gypsy Loddy", c.1720 
The earliest text may be "The Gypsy Loddy", published in the Roxburghe Ballads with an assigned date of 1720. The first two verses of this version are as follows:There was seven gypsies all in a gang,

They were brisk and bonny, O;

They rode till they came to the Earl of Casstle's house,

And there they sang most sweetly, O.

The Earl of Castle's lady came down,

With the waiting-maid beside her;

As soon as her fair face they saw,

They called their grandmother over.In the final two lines shown above, they called their grandmother over is assumed to be a corruption of They cast their glamour over her (i.e. they cast a spell), not vice versa. This is the motivation in many texts for the lady leaving her lord; in others she leaves of her own free will.

Johnny Faa and the Earl of Cassilis 
A more certain date than that of "The Gypsy Loddy", c.1720 of a version from 1740 in Allan Ramsay's Tea-Table Miscellany, which included the ballad as of "The Gypsy Johnny Faa". Many printed versions after this appear to copy Ramsay, including nineteenth century broadside versions. Nick Tosches, in his Country: The Twisted Roots of Rock 'N' Roll, spends part of his first chapter examining the song's history. The ballad, according to Tosches, retells the story of John Faa, a Scottish 17th-century Gypsy outlaw, and Lady Jane Hamilton, wife of The Earl of Cassilis (identified in local tradition as the John Kennedy 6th Earl of Cassilis). Lord Cassilis led a band of men (some sources say 16, others 7), to abduct her. They were caught and hanged on the "Dool Tree" in 1643. The "Gypsies" were killed (except for one, who escaped) and Lady Jane Hamilton was imprisoned for the remainder of her life, dying in 1642. Tosches also compares the song's narrative to the ancient Greek myth of Orpheus and Eurydice.

Common ancestor and "Lady Cassiles Lilt" 
Differences between "The Gypsy Loddy" (c.1720) and "The Gypsy Johnny Faa" (1740) suggest that they derive from one or more earlier versions, so the song is most likely at least as old as the seventeenth century.  B. H. Bronson discovered that a tune in the Skene manuscripts and dated earlier than 1600, resembles later tunes for this song and is entitled "Lady Cassiles Lilt". The inference is that a song concerning Lord and Lady Cassilis existed before the two earliest manuscripts, and was the source of both.

Robert Burns 
Robert Burns used the song in his Reliques of Robert Burns; consisting chiefly of original letters, poems, and critical observations on Scottish songs (1808). Due to the Romanichal origins of the main protagonist Davie or Johnny Faa, the ballad was translated into Anglo-Romany in 1890 by the Gypsy Lore Society.

Traditional recordings 
Hundreds of versions of the song survived in the oral tradition well into the twentieth century and were recorded by folklorists from traditional singers.The song was popular in England, where recordings were made of figures including Harry Cox, Walter Pardon and Frank Hinchliffe singing the song in the 1960s and 70s. In 1908, the composer and song collector Percy Grainger used phonograph technology to record a man named Archer Lane of Winchcombe, Gloucestershire singing a version of the song; the recording is available in two parts on the British Library Sound Archive website.

Many Irish traditional singers have performed versions learnt in the oral tradition, including Paddy Tunney, John Reilly and Robert Cinnamond; Paddy Tunney's recording is available on the Irish Traditional Music Archive. 

Some traditional recordings were made in Scotland, including by the Scottish traveller Jeannie Robertson and her daughter Lizzie Higgins, whose version can be heard online via the Vaughan Williams Memorial Library.

The song has been recorded many times in the United States, mostly under the title of "Gypsy Davy" or "Black Jack Davy", by people whose ancestors brought the songs from the British Isles. American performers include the Appalachian musicians Jean Ritchie, Buell Kazee, Bascom Lamar Lunsford, Dillard Chandler and Texas Gladden; James Madison Carpenter recorded a woman singing a version in Boone, North Carolina in the early 1930s, which can be heard on the Vaughan Williams Memorial Library website. Many traditional Ozark singers including Almeda Riddle and Ollie Gilbert whose recording can be heard via the Max Hunter collection.

The following four verses are the beginning of the Ritchie family version of "Gypsy Laddie", as sung by Jean Ritchie:An English lord came home one night

Inquiring for his Lady.

The servants said on every hand,

She’s gone with the Gypsy Laddie.

Go saddle up my milk white steed,

Go saddle me up my brownie,

And I will ride both night and day

Till I overtake my bonnie.

Oh, he rode East and he rode West,

And at last he found her.

She was lying on the green, green grass

And the gypsy’s arms all around her.

Oh, how can you leave your house and land?

How can you leave your money?

How can you leave your rich, young Lord

To be a gypsy’s bonnie?

Recent history
At the start of the twentieth century, one version, collected and set to piano accompaniment by Cecil Sharp, reached a much wider public. Under the title "The Wraggle Taggle Gypsies O!", it was published in several collections, most notably one entitled English Folk Songs for Schools, leading the song to be taught to generations of English school children. It was later occasionally used by jazz musicians, for example the instrumental "Raggle Taggle" by the Territory band Boots and His Buddies, and the vocal recording by Maxine Sullivan.

In America, the country music recording industry spread versions of the song by such notable musicians as Cliff Carlisle and the Carter Family, and later by the rockabilly singer Warren Smith, under the title "Black Jack David". In the American folk music revival, Woody Guthrie sang and copyrighted a version he called "Gypsy Davy" (which was later also sung by his son Arlo).

Popular recordings 
A vast number of artists and groups have recorded the song. This selection is limited to artists and/or albums found in other Wikipedia articles:

Related songs
The song "The Whistling Gypsy" also describes a lady running off with a "gypsy rover". However, there is no melancholy, no hardship and no conflict.

The Bob Dylan song "Tin Angel" from 2012's album Tempest is derived from "The Raggle Taggle Gypsy".  

The song "Lizzie Lindsay" has a similar theme. Robert Burns adapted the song into "Sweet Tibby Dunbar", a shorter version of the story. There is also a children's version by Elizabeth Mitchell which has lyrical content changed to be about a young girl "charming hearts of the ladies", and sailing "across the deep blue sea, where the skies are always sunny".

Although the hero of this song is often called "Johnny Faa" or even "Davy Faa", he should not be confused with the hero/villain of "Davy Faa (Remember the Barley Straw)". [Silber and Silber misidentify all their texts] as deriving from "Child 120", which is actually "Robin Hood's Death". According to The Faber Book of Ballads the name Faa was common among Gypsies in the 17th century.

Bella Hardy's song "Good Man's Wife" is in the voice of Lord Cassillis' wife. The theme of the song is how she fell in love with the gypsy as her marriage turned cold, and the song ends with the familiar exchange of featherbed and wealth for sleeping in a field with her love; the husband's pursuit does not occur.

Broadsides
 Bodleian, Harding B 11(1446), "Gypsy Laddie", W. Stephenson (Gateshead), 1821–1838; also Harding B 11(2903), "Gypsy Loddy"; Harding B 19(45), "The Dark-Eyed Gipsy O"; Harding B 25(731), "Gipsy Loddy"; Firth b.25(220), "The Gipsy Laddy"; Harding B 11(1317), "The Gipsy Laddie, O"; Firth b.26(198), Harding B 15(116b), 2806 c.14(140), "The Gipsy Laddie"; Firth b.25(56), "Gypsie Laddie"
 Murray, Mu23-y3:030, "The Gypsy Laddie", unknown, 19C
 NLScotland, L.C.Fol.178.A.2(092), "The Gipsy Laddie", unknown, c. 1875

References

External links
 "The Wraggle Taggle Gipsies-O" melody and lyrics
 Origins: "The Raggle-Taggle Gypsy" at The Mudcat Café
 Covers at SecondHandSongs
 Covers at WhoSampled
 Child Ballad #200 Entry at Contemplator.com
 The Gypsy Laddie / Seven Yellow Gipsies / Raggle Taggle Gipsies at mainlynorfolk.info

18th-century songs
Bob Dylan songs
Jean Ritchie songs
Border ballads
Child Ballads
Northumbrian folklore
Scottish folklore
Romani in Scotland
Works about Scottish Travellers